The Chemins de fer du Morbihan  (CM) was a metre gauge railway in Morbihan, France, with some track in Loire-Inférieure.

History

The CM was a Voie Ferrées d'Interêt Local system. In 1892, the Compagnie des Chemins de Fer du Morbihan was given permission to build a network of metre gauge lines in Morbihan. The first lines opened in 1902, with further lines opening in 1903, 1905, 1906, 1910 and 1921. The first closures were in 1935. Although railcars had been introduced in the 1930s, all rail passenger traffic ceased in 1939, along with another series of line closures. The passenger service was provided by buses from then on. Most of the surviving lines closed in 1947 and the final closures were in 1948.

Lines

The main line was Gourin - Lorient - Meslan - Lochminé - Vannes - La Roche-Bernard.

Branches were from Meslan - Pontivy - Ploermel. Surzur - Port Navalo, Baud - Port Louis, La Roche-Bernard - Herbignac - Piriac-sur-Mer - Guérande, Herbignac - Saint-Nazaire, Pontivy - Moulin Gilet, Pontivy - Guémené-sur-Scorff.

Rolling stock

Steam locomotives

 14 Pingueley 0-6-0T
 101 Pingueley 0-6-0T works number 165/1905. To Forges de Gueugnon after closure. Preserved on the Chemin de Fer de la Baie de Somme.
 103 Pingueley 0-6-0T works number 167/1905. To Forges de Gueugnon after closure. Preserved at Tournon.
 3 Corpet-Louvet 0-6-0T locomotives delivered in 1922. Works numbers 1605-07.

Railcars

 One petrol railcar is preserved at the Musée des Tramways à Vapeur et des chemins de fer Secondaire français (MTVS).

Passenger stock

 B153, a bogie carriage, is preserved at the MTVS.

Freight stock

The line today

The station building at Préfailles survives, recently restored.

References

External links
Rail Bretagne A site for all railways in Brittany, forums have photos of old postcards of the line. 

Buildings and structures in Morbihan
Buildings and structures in Ille-et-Vilaine
Metre gauge railways in France
Transport in Brittany